Teresa Lynn Strasser (born June 8, 1970) is an American writer and television personality known for hosting the first season of the home makeover show While You Were Out on TLC. She also co-hosted The Adam Carolla Show.

Personal life
Strasser grew up in San Francisco, with her mother. She was raised Jewish. She attended The Brandeis School of San Francisco as well as Lick-Wilmerding High School on a low-income scholarships. She went on to study journalism at New York University.

Teresa attended Anorexia Anonymous for more than seven years.

Strasser married Daniel Wachinski, an IBM accountant, in a small ceremony at the Venetian in Las Vegas, Nevada, on June 25, 2008. The couple's first baby, a boy named Nathaniel "Buster" James, was born on September 24, 2009. Her second son, Andrew, was born in 2012.

She currently lives in Phoenix where she hosts syndicated entertainment show, "The List,” for which she won a 2015 Emmy Award for Best Host.

Career

Early years
Strasser began writing for Win Ben Stein's Money in 1997, winning a Daytime Emmy Award, and also had several small film roles and writing jobs, including a writing credit for Who Wants to Be a Millionaire.

While You Were Out
In 2002, Strasser hosted fifty episodes of While You Were Out when former host Anna Bocci left the show.  Strasser had previously served as a writer for the show. She did not consider herself handy, but she compensated with her dark sense of humor and empathy, as she cried after several renovations. Strasser left the show after one season.

The Adam Carolla Show and The Adam Carolla Podcast
Strasser replaced Rachel Perry on The Adam Carolla Show on May 8, 2006, as the news anchor for the radio program She had previously served as a fill-in before Perry officially left the show. In 2010, she left the show when taping was moved to nighttime, which caused a scheduling conflict. She was replaced by "radio co-host and News Girl," Alison Rosen.

Teresa's Ex-Files
A segment on the show in September 2006 focused on Strasser's past relationships.  Her past boyfriends, such as Jimmy Kimmel Live! writer and The Sarah Silverman Program actor Steve Agee and a marketing executive named Brandon, discussed why their relationship failed.  Normally, the skit is embarrassing for Strasser and her ex, such as when she claimed Agee cried after sex. The segment debuted September 6, 2006 with writer Greg Lee, whom Strasser dated for eight months.

During the segment with Agee, Strasser also admitted that she had once been conned by a sexual pervert. She said a man stripped and masturbated in her apartment after she had invited him in, mistakenly thinking one of her friends had bought her a Strip-o-gram.

Strasser is also known to have dated former American Idol host Brian Dunkleman.

The Parent Experiment Podcast
From February to August 2010, Strasser and Lynette Carolla (wife of Adam Carolla) co-hosted a weekly hourlong podcast on their parenting experiences. Strasser left the Parent Experiment due to other commitments, and was replaced by Susanna Brisk.

Peter Tilden Show
On August 19, 2010, KABC announced that Strasser would be joining the Peter Tilden Show as Tilden's female co-anchor.  Strasser began her work there on August 23, 2010.
On August 26, 2011 Teresa did her last show on KABC in order to focus on her TV, commercial voiceover and camera work.

Easy Listening Podcast
In April 2019 Teresa started a podcast with Gina Grad to discuss other podcasts.

Other television work
After leaving While You Were Out, Strasser hosted Lover's Lounge, a dating game show block on the Game Show Network in 2000 and 2001 with Helen Keaney.  She was also a feature story reporter for several episodes of Good Day New York in 2004, while also being the New York correspondent for both Good Day Live and On-Air With Ryan Seacrest.  Strasser worked as a "love coach" along with Shop 'Til You Drop host JD Roberto on the 2006 ABC series How to Get the Guy until its cancellation. In October 2006, she replaced Debra Wilson as the co-host of the TV Guide Channel show TV Watercooler. She frequently appears on VH1 and E!'s various "list" shows. She also guest starred on Alicia Silverstone led dramedy, Miss Match. Strasser served a brief stint as a correspondent on the entertainment and gossip news show TMZ on TV which premiered in September 2007.  She quit TMZ due to a time conflict with the Adam Carolla Show. In addition, she has covered the red carpet for the Emmy Awards and the Tony Awards, for E! and TV Guide Network, respectively. Teresa currently works as a host and reporter for the new Scripps Networks show The List. The program features pop culture topics, news and current issues, as well as celebrity news and events and what's going on around town. Currently co-host on The List, a TV pop culture information show.

Writing career
Strasser has worked regularly as a freelance columnist for The Los Angeles Times and The Jewish Journal of Greater Los Angeles, and won an award on June 24, 2006, for columnist of the year from the Los Angeles Press Club. Strasser is currently a regular contributor for the calendar section of The Los Angeles Times.

She also wrote a book titled, EXPLOITING MY BABY: Because It's Exploiting Me, which was published in January 2011.

ABC ordered a pilot, "Mother Teresa" to be written by Strasser based on her book, "Exploiting My Baby"

Awards and recognition
 Emmy Award - Best Host "The List" (2015)
 LA Times Bestseller, #8 Paperback Nonfiction for Exploiting My Baby
 Three Los Angeles Press Club Awards (2004 and 2005 for Columnist of the Year)
 Emmy Nomination – writer (commentary) – Suncoast Chapter
 Emmy Nomination – program host/moderator – Suncoast Chapter
 Simon Rockower Awards for both Excellence in Feature Writing and Writing about Singles ("When Booty Calls")
 Emmy Award, Outstanding Special Class Writing, "Win Ben Stein's Money"
 Daytime Emmy Nomination – Outstanding Special Class Series Host "While You Were Out" TLC (2003)

References

External links
 
 Teresa Strasser Interview
 
 Exploiting My Baby (blog October 2012)
 

American columnists
American radio news anchors
American radio personalities
Television personalities from Los Angeles
American women television personalities
Jewish American writers
New York University alumni
1970 births
Living people
Writers from Los Angeles
Writers from San Francisco
People from Panorama City, Los Angeles
21st-century American Jews